Ali Atwa (– October 2021) was a Lebanese national and member of the Islamist organization Hezbollah. Atwa was also known as Ammar Mansour Bouslim and Hassan Rostom Salim.

Ali was wanted by the United States government for his alleged involvement in the 14 June 1985 hijacking of TWA Flight 847. (He allegedly intended to help hijack the plane but was bumped from the flight. He was arrested but was then released by the Greek government as part of the deal to release the hostages. He then re-joined the hijackers in Algiers on board the hijacked airplane). This hijacking resulted in the death of United States Navy diver Robert Stethem.

On 1 October 2001, Atwa along with two other alleged participants in the hijacking was placed on the initial list of the U.S. Federal Bureau of Investigation's top 22 Most Wanted Terrorists, which was released to the public by President Bush. A reward of US$ 5 million was being offered for information leading to his arrest and conviction. He died of cancer in October 2021 in Lebanon.

See also
 Imad Mughniyah
 Hassan Izz-Al-Din

References

Sources
 Rewards for Justice
 Atwa profile at FBI Most Wanted Terrorist

External links
 Uli Derickson - Legacy of Courage

1960 births
2021 deaths
Hezbollah hijackers
FBI Most Wanted Terrorists
Individuals designated as terrorists by the United States government
Deaths from cancer in Lebanon